Star Test was a British TV programme that ran from 1989 to 1991 on Channel 4. The show took an interview format, in which the guest "star" was seated facing directly to camera, questioned by an unseen voice (Kara Noble). The topics discussed were chosen from an on-screen menu, after which the interviewee selected questions by number from an unseen list. The show was lampooned in two British comedy sketch shows; French and Saunders and Bo' Selecta!, the latter being some 12 years after Star Test ended.

Interviewees
Roland Gift of pop band Fine Young Cannibals was the show's first guest. Other guests included Clint Boon, Peter Gabriel, Bernard Sumner, Craig Charles, Robert Palmer, Stephen Fry, Kenny Everett, Tony Slattery, Garry Bushell, Kim Wilde, Julian Cope, Richard E. Grant, Matt Goss, Luke Goss, Julian Clary, Terence Trent D'Arby, Wayne Hussey, Danielle Dax, Ken Russell, Wendy James, Hazell Dean, Paddy Ashdown, Siobhan Fahey and Tony James.

Transmissions

Series

Episodes

References

External links
 

1989 British television series debuts
1991 British television series endings
1980s British television talk shows
1990s British television talk shows
Channel 4 original programming
British television talk shows
English-language television shows